Tochka is a 2002 album by Leningrad. "Точка", means 'dot' or 'point'. In Russian slang, this can refer to a place of prostitution or somewhere that vodka is sold.

Track listing
"Money" – 3:14
"Наркоман" - Narkoman - (Druggie) – 4:51
"Злая пуля" - Zlaya pulya - (Evil Bullet) – 4:33
"Dance" – 2:35
"Никто не любит" - Nikto ne lyubit - (Nobody Loves) – 3:21
"Полет Шнура" - Polet Shnura - (The Flight of Shnur)" – 2:29 
"Нужен Гол" - Nuzhen gol - (Goal Needed) – 4:22
"Танго (Я так люблю тебя)" - Tango (Ya tak lyublyu tebya) - (Tango (I love you so)) – 4:27
"Однажды" - Odnazhdy - (Once) – 2:44
"Где же ваши руки?" - Gde zhe vashi ruki? - (Where are your hands?) – 6:21

External links
Album available for download from the official Leningrad website

2002 albums
Leningrad (band) albums